Murrayville or Murraysville can refer to any of the following places:

Canada
 Murrayville, British Columbia, a town within the Township of Langley.

United States
 Murrayville, Illinois, a village in Morgan County
 Murrayville, Georgia, an unincorporated community in Hall County
 Murraysville, North Carolina, a census-designated place
 Murraysville, Ohio, an unincorporated community
 Murraysville, West Virginia, an unincorporated community

Australia
 Murrayville, Victoria, a town in the Rural City of Mildura